The 11th Annual Streamy Awards was the eleventh installment of the Streamy Awards honoring the best in American streaming television series and their creators. The ceremony was held on December 11, 2021, hosted by Larray and livestreamed exclusively to YouTube. Larray hosted the show from a party bus in Los Angeles alongside special guest Issa Twaimz. The show continued the Creator Honor awards, introduced the previous year, which featured past Streamy award winners presenting the award to creators that resonated with them in 2021. It also featured sneak-peaks of YouTube videos by creators such as Dixie D'Amelio, Lexi Rivera, RDCWorld, Safiya Nygaard, and ZHC, including a preview of Markiplier's YouTube Originals interactive special In Space with Markiplier. MrBeast's Team Seas fundraising initiative to clean oceans, rivers and beaches was highlighted during a special segment of the show.

Performers 
The 11th Streamy Awards featured the musical performances of the following artists:

Winners and nominees 

 

The nominees were announced on October 20, 2021. Winners were announced during the digital ceremony on December 11, hosted by Larray from a party bus in Los Angeles. Winners of the categories were selected by an independent judging panel.

Winners are listed first, in bold.

Creator Honor awards

 Swoop (presented by Bailey Sarian)
 Amelie Zilber (presented by Jay Shetty)
 Remi Cruz (presented by LaurDIY)
 Jeremy Fielding (presented by Mark Rober)

Brand Awards

Social Good Awards

Reception 
Paul Grein of Billboard said that the show had a "distinctly young vibe" and described Larray and Issa Twaimz as having an "easy rapport" while delivering awards from the Streamys bus. He felt that the return of the Creator Honor awards was the "show's smartest move" because it allowed for genuine moments between the creators presenting the awards and the honorees. International Creator of the Year winner Mythpat praised the Streamys' use of an independent judging panel rather than voting, saying "It is not always about the number of followers but about the quality and type of content. Even someone with 1,000 followers can create path-breaking content while someone with one million followers can create mediocre content. It is always the content that should be valued. I would like to see more award organisers practising this system of judging." The show had a 43% increase in YouTube viewership compared to 2020.

References 

Streamy Awards
2021 in Los Angeles
2021 awards
2021 in Internet culture